The purpose of the Bachelor of Liberal Studies (BLS) degree is to provide students with a solid multidisciplinary preparation in the Humanities, Natural Sciences, Social Sciences and the Arts, subsequently allowing them to pursue careers in education, business, government, and other such fields. The goal of a liberal studies major is to train students to communicate effectively, both orally and in writing, to develop skills in critical thinking and problem solving, and to imbue critical thinking with ethical thought. Liberal studies provides students with opportunities for an extensive study of the liberal arts and sciences and for a broad understanding of various academic fields of interest.

Curriculum
A student who seeks to be awarded a degree such as B.A. in Liberal Studies generally undertakes a variety of subjects, including: literature and language studies, mathematics, visual and performing arts, physical education, history and social sciences, science, and human development.  According to the American Academy for Liberal Education, core curriculum can include "interdisciplinary programs in the arts and sciences, programs of study in the histories and heritages of Western and non-Western civilizations, global and trans-cultural studies, ethnic and area studies, musical and theatrical appreciation and performance, and programs in creative writing."

Occupational opportunities
Occupational opportunities include:
Banking or retail management trainee
Buyer trainee
Claims adjuster
Underwriter
College/university admission counselor
Convention/meeting planner
Development officer/fundraiser
Human resources professional
Insurance agent
Management 
Public relations specialist
Sales representative
Teacher
Writer
Intelligence Officer/Analyst
(Some positions may require additional education and/or training)

Notable degree holders
James R. Helmly, Chief of the U.S. Army Reserve, Commanding General of the United States Army Reserve

See also
Master of Liberal Studies
Doctor of Liberal Studies

References

External links
American Academy for Liberal Education
Liberal Studies Major in New York
Association of American Colleges and Universities Resources on Liberal Education

Liberal Studies